The Killesberg Railway (German: Killesbergbahn) is a miniature railway in the Killesberg Park in Stuttgart, Germany.

Opened with the park in 1939, the  gauge track travels in a  loop around the park. Diesel locomotives pull trains around the park daily during the summer months whilst steam locomotives are used for special occasions.

The park now maintains four locomotives, of which two are powered by diesel and two by steam. Blitzschwoab is the oldest of the two diesel engines, manufactured in 1950. Schwoabapfeil was manufactured in 1992. The steam engines Tazzelwurm and Springerle were delivered to the park in 1950 to replace the two that originally operated on the line until they were removed to Leipzig during World War II.

The Killesbergbahn was formerly operated by the Stuttgart Fair company and today by a promotion association.

See also 
 Fifteen-inch gauge railway

Transport in Stuttgart
Railway lines in Baden-Württemberg
Heritage railways in Germany
15 in gauge railways in Germany